Richard Owen Jones  (1867 – 1936) was a Welsh international footballer. He was part of the Wales national football team between 1887 and 1890, playing 3 matches. He played his first match on 21 March 1887 against Scotland and his last match on 15 March 1890 against England. At club level, he played for Bangor.

See also
 List of Wales international footballers (alphabetical)

References

1867 births
Welsh footballers
Wales international footballers
Bangor City F.C. players
Place of birth missing
Date of death missing
1936 deaths
Association footballers not categorized by position